Marie-Chantal Perron (born February 1, 1967) is a Canadian actress and fashion designer. She was born in Châteauguay, Quebec.

Biography 
Perron studied at the National Theatre School of Canada, graduating in 1989.

She began her career playing in numerous Téléromans and television series, including Marguerite Volant (1996), Le Volcan tranquille (1997) and Réseaux (1998). Additionally, she was active in stage productions, appearing in fifteen plays with directors like Serge Denoncourt, René Richard Cyr ou Robert Gravel.

In 2002, she played the title role of Mademoiselle Charlotte in the children's film La Mystérieuse Mademoiselle C. Her performance earned her a nomination for "Best Actress" at the 2003 Jutra Awards for Quebec cinema. Perron reprised her role in the 2004 sequel L'Incomparable Mademoiselle C..

In 2005, she was cast in the role of Élise Belzile in the television series Nos étés, which she was nominated for "Best Supporting Actress:Drama" at the Gémeaux awards.

In 2011 she won a "Best Actress" Gémeaux award for her role as Annette Léger in the television series Destinées.

Fashion design 
In 205, Perron created a line of clothes called "Dandine". The line, which included seventy different pieces, was sold exclusively at Kamikaze Curiosités, a boutique on Rue Saint-Denis in Montréal.

She followed this with three other collections, all sold at Kamikaze Curiosités. In 2007, she launched her "40 Dresses for my 40 years" collection, a spring-summer collection composed of dresses in shimmering colours. In 2008 she released her "Dandine Wrapped!" collection, composed primarily of Frock coats. Then, in November 2011, she launched her third, "Worthy, by Dandine", composed of long, warm skirts and accessories.

Filmography

Film 

 2000 : Monsieur, monsieur
 2001 : Les Boys 3 : Sylvie
 2002 : La Mystérieuse Mademoiselle C. : Mademoiselle Charlotte
 2004 : L'Incomparable Mademoiselle C. : Mademoiselle Charlotte
 2006 : Le Secret de ma mère : Annie
 2008 : Borderline : Caroline
 2008 : Babine : Jeanette Brodeur
 2012 : Ésimésac : Jeanette Brodeur

Television 

 1987 – 1990 : La Maison Deschênes : Rita
 1987 – 1994 : Chop Suey : Clémence Pistacchio
 1992 – 1995 : Graffiti : Sofia Coronetti
 1995 – 1996 : Les Héritiers Duval : Sonia Lanthier
 1995 : Le Sorcier : Rose
 1996 : Marguerite Volant : Simone
 1996 : 10-07: L'affaire Kafka : Louise
 1997 – 1998 : Le Volcan tranquille : Coralie Lebrun
 1998 – 1999 : Réseaux : Sylvie
 1999 – 2008 : Histoires de filles : Marie-Jo Desforges-Gauthier
 2001 : Dans une galaxie près de chez vous : Destinée
 2003 – 2004 : Hommes en quarantaine : Chantale
 2005 : L'Héritière de Grande Ourse : Mère
 2005 : Cover Girl : Catherine
 2005 – 2008 : Nos étés : Élise Belzile
 2007 – 2014 : Destinées : Annette Léger
 2008 : Blaise le blasé : Fanny Cotton (voix)
 2008 – 2016 : Les Parent : Marie
 2009 – 2013 : Le Gentleman : Nathalie Cadieux
 2010 – 2012 : Les Rescapés : Marguerite Panzini
 2013 : 30 vies : Myriam Gendron
 2015 : Unité 9 : Madeleine Tessier
 2018 : Demain des hommes : Élise Gagnon

Awards and nominations

Nominations 

 2003 : Nomination pour le prix Jutra dans la catégorie « Meilleure actrice » pour son rôle de Mademoiselle Charlotte dans La Mystérieuse Mademoiselle C.
 2005 : Nomination pour le prix Gémeaux dans la catégorie « Meilleure interprétation rôle de soutien féminin : dramatique » pour son rôle d'Élise Belzile dans la série Nos étés

Récompenses 

 2011 : prix Gémeaux du « Meilleur premier rôle féminin » pour son rôle d'Annette Léger dans Destinées
 2008 – Prix Artis, rôle féminin dans une télésérie québécoise

References

External links 

 
 
 Fiche télé sur Qui Joue Qui ?

Actresses from Quebec
1967 births
Living people
20th-century Canadian actresses
21st-century Canadian actresses
Canadian television actresses
Canadian film actresses
National Theatre School of Canada alumni
People from Châteauguay